Maja Station (MJ) is a class II railway station located in Maja, Maja, Lebak Regency. This station is included in the Operation Area I Jakarta.

Initially, The station is the terminus of electrified tracks system from Tanah Abang Station to Maja Station. Since 17 April 2013, has been serving the KRL Commuterline to the Tanah Abang Station and has been crossed by a double tracks.

In order to improve the commuter train services in the Lebak Regency, PT KAI Commuter Jabodetabek (now PT Kereta Commuter Indonesia) then extended the KRL Commuterline route to Rangkasbitung Station. The KRL is run as of 1 April 2017.

Building and layout 
In 2014, the station's new building was built by the Directorate General of Railways. The new station building has a modern minimalist style which is also applied to Palmerah, Kebayoran and Parungpanjang stations. On 11 May 2016, the new station building was completed replacing the old building to the northwest. In addition, the train line has increased to 3 with line 3 being the new buffer stop.

Initially, the station had two railway lines with line 2 as a straight line. Since the double track plot from Maja– was operated on 17 December 2015 and the Rangkasbitung–Maja plot was operated on 1 December 2019, the existing line 2 of this station is made a straight track towards , while line 1 is made a straight track towards Rangkasbitung. This station, since 17 April 2013, has served KRL Commuterline AC to Tanah Abang Station and has been fully crossed by double track on 1 December 2019. Currently, only one KRL Commuterline service stops at this station, namely the Tanah Abang–Rangkasbitung line.

Services
The following is a list of train services at the Maja Station.
KRL Commuterline
 Green Line, towards  (Maja branch)

References

External links

Lebak Regency
Railway stations in Banten
Railway stations opened in 1899